The Kenya National Disaster Operation Centre (NDOC) was established in 1998 to deal with management and co-ordination of disaster response at a national level in Kenya.

History
The NDOC was established in January 1998 by an act of Parliament to act as the focal point for co-ordinating response to emergencies and disasters in Kenya. It is on constant standby, with a reporting centre running 24 hours a day, 7 days a week, from which emergency operations, activities and events are recorded and communicated for action.

Functions of NDOC
The functions of NDOC are:
To co-ordinate and control of disaster response efforts,
To act as the command centre for all communications and information relating to response operations, and
To liaise with responsible ministries on national response efforts.

Background
The Kenya National Disaster Operation Centre was established in 1998 in response to the El Nino rains to co-ordinate disaster management and response operations in Kenya.

Mission
The mission of the NDOC is to monitor, co-ordinate, mobilise national resources to respond to disaster incidents in the country

Vision
To be the leading focal point of disaster management and response in Kenya

Responsibilities
The responsibilities of the NDOC include:
 Coordination at the national level of all disaster management activities before, during and after the disaster
 Ensuring that all personnel and volunteer agencies are informed of the activation of disaster contingency plans
 Translating the decisions of the National Disaster Coordinating Committee (NDCC) into action and/or instructions and ensuring that those instructions are transmitted and carried out by the Ministries/Departments to whom they are directed
 Preparing all inventories of resources and assets countrywide
 Developing a prioritised list of needs for donors to meet shortfalls in relief supplies
 Preparation of evacuation plans, shelter and refugee areas including identification of executing agencies
 Arranging clearance for aircraft, ships as well as customs and visa clearance for overseas relief personnel and agencies
 Preparation of media programmes for  public information and press briefings at the centre
 Carrying out an annual review, evaluation and validation of national and sectoral disaster mitigation plans with a view of improving their effectiveness and efficiency
 Preparing and issuing a daily situation report (SITREP) to the subscribing ministries/departments

References

Disaster
Emergency management in Kenya